Ethnic townships, ethnic towns, and ethnic sums are fourth-level administrative units designated for ethnic minorities of political divisions in China. They are not considered to be autonomous and do not enjoy the laws pertaining to the larger ethnic autonomous areas such as autonomous regions, autonomous prefectures, autonomous counties, and autonomous banners.

The only ethnic sum is Evenk Ethnic Sum in Chen Barag Banner, Inner Mongolia.

Numbers of ethnic townships, towns and sums

List of ethnic townships and ethnic towns

Anhui 
 Paifang Hui and Manchu Ethnic Township 
 Saijian Hui Ethnic Township
 Gugou Hui Ethnic Township
 Gudui Hui Ethnic Township
 Lichong Hui Ethnic Township
 Taodian Hui Ethnic Township

Beijing 
 Changying Hui Ethnic Township
 Changshaoying Manchu Ethnic Township
 Labagoumen Manchu Ethnic Township
 Yujiawu Hui Ethnic Township
 Zhangshaoying Manchu Ethnic Township

Chongqing 
 Debao Tujia Ethnic Township
 Henghe Tujia Ethnic Township
 Mozi Tujia Ethnic Township
 Shiqiao Miao and Tujia Ethnic Township
 Wenfu Miao and Tujia Ethnic Township
 Houping Miao and Tujia Ethnic Township
 Haokou Miao and Gelao Township
 Taihe Tujia Ethnic Township
 Chang'an Tujia Ethnic Township
 Longqiao Tujia Ethnic Township
 Yunwu Tujia Ethnic Township
 Qingshui Tujia Ethnic Township

Fujian 

 Xiaocang She Ethnic Township
 Huokou She Ethnic Township
 Guanzhuang She Ethnic Township
 Lufeng She Ethnic Township
 Jinhan She Ethnic Township
 Banzhong She Ethnic Township Township
 Muyun She Ethnic Township Township
 Kangcuo She Ethnic Township Township
 Xiamen She Ethnic Township
 Jiayang She Ethnic Township
 Shuimen She Ethnic Township
 Chongru She Ethnic Township
 Yantian She Ethnic Township
 Baiqi Hui Ethnic Township
 Qingshui She Ethnic Township
 Zhiping She Ethnic Township
 Longjiao She Ethnic Township
 Huxi She Ethnic Township
 Chiling She Ethnic Township

Gansu

Guangdong 
 Zhangxi She Ethnic Township
 Lantian Yao Ethnic Township
 Yao'an Yao Ethnic Township
 Sanshui Yao Ethnic Township
 Chengjia Yao Ethnic Township
 Shendushui Yao Ethnic Township
 Shuai Zhuang and Yao Ethnic Township

Guangxi 
 Guzhai Yao Ethnic Township
 Jiafang Yao Ethnic Township
 Zhenwei Yao Ethnic Township
 Wangdian Yao Ethnic Township
 Lingzhan Yao Ethnic Township
 Chaoli Yao Ethnic Township
 Shali Yao Ethnic Township
 Yuhong Yao Ethnic Township
 Zuodeng Yao Ethnic Township
 Lucheng Yao Ethnic Township
 Lizhou Yao Ethnic Township
 Bagui Yao Ethnic Township
 Badu Yao Ethnic Township
 Nazuo Miao Ethnic Township
 Puhe Miao Ethnic Township
 Zubie Yao and Miao Ethnic Township
 Nanping Yao Ethnic Township
 Guo'an Yao Ethnic Township
 Malian Yao Ethnic Township
 Caoping Hui Ethnic Township
 Wantian Yao Ethnic Township
 Huangsha Yao Ethnic Township
 Pulu Yao Ethnic Township
 Jiaojiang Yao Ethnic Township
 Dongshan Yao Ethnic Township
 Huajiang Yao Ethnic Township
 Fulong Yao Ethnic Township
 Beiya Yao Ethnic Township
 Sannong Yao Ethnic Township
 Jinya Yao Ethnic Township
 Pingle Yao Ethnic Township
 Jiangzhou Yao Ethnic Township
 Xunle Miao Ethnic Township
 Zhongbao Miao Ethnic Township
 Bawei Yao Ethnic Township
 Lihu Yao Ethnic Township
 Bala Yao Ethnic Township
 Huangdong Yao Ethnic Township
 Daping Yao Ethnic Township
 Xianhui Yao Ethnic Township
 Huashan Yao Ethnic Township
 Liang'an Yao Ethnic Township
 Guzhai Mulao Ethnic Township
 Tonglian Yao Ethnic Township
 Gunbei Dong Ethnic Township
 Tongle Miao Ethnic Township
 Fulu Miao Ethnic Township
 Gaoji Yao Ethnic Township
 Changping Yao Ethnic Township
 Xiayi Yao Ethnic Township

Guizhou

Hainan 
 none

Hebei 
 Jiumen Hui Ethnic Township
 Pengjiazhuang Hui Ethnic Township
 Gaotou Hui Ethnic Township
 Haotouzhuang Hui Ethnic Township
 Loucun Manchu Ethnic Township
 Lingyunce Hui and Manchu Ethnic Township
 Yang'erzhuang Hui Ethnic Township
 Xincun Hui Ethnic Township
 Yangsanmu Hui Ethnic Township
 Jiedi Hui Ethnic Township
 Dulin Hui Ethnic Township
 Litianmu Hui Ethnic Township
 Dazhecun Hui Ethnic Township
 Benzhai Hui Ethnic Township
 Xidi Manchu Ethnic Township
 Gangzi Manchu Ethnic Township
 Liangjia Manchu Ethnic Township
 Yinjiaying Manchu Ethnic Township
 Miaozigou Mongol and Manchu Ethnic Township
 Pianpoying Manchu Ethnic Township
 Badaying Mongol Ethnic Township
 Taipingzhuang Manchu Ethnic Township
 Jiutun Manchu Ethnic Township
 Xi'achao Manchu and Mongol Ethnic Township
 Baihugou Manchu and Mongol Ethnic Township
 Pingfang Manchu Ethnic Township
 Anchungoumen Manchu Ethnic Township
 Xiaoying Manchu Ethnic Township
 Xigou Manchu Ethnic Township
 Dengchang Manchu Ethnic Township
 Wudaoyingzi Manchu Ethnic Township
 Mayingzi Ethnic Township
 Fujiadian Manchu Ethnic Township
 Datun Manchu Ethnic Township
 Liuxi Manchu Ethnic Township
 Qijiadai Manchu Ethnic Township
 Pingfang Manchu and Mongol Ethnic Township
 Maolangou Manchu and Mongol Ethnic Township
 Guozhangzi Manchu Ethnic Township
 Nantian Manchu Ethnic Township
 Bagualing Manchu Ethnic Township
 Yingzhen Hui Ethnic Township
 Chencun Hui Ethnic Township
 Daweihe Hui and Manchu Ethnic Township
 Guanjiawu Hui Ethnic Township
 Xiaxiaying Manchu Ethnic Township
 Tangquan Manchu Ethnic Township
 Dongling Manchu Ethnic Township
 Da'erhao Hui Ethnic Township
 Wangjialou Hui Ethnic Township

Heilongjiang 
 Liaodian Manchu Ethnic Township
 Hongqi Manchu Ethnic Township
 Hedong Korean Ethnic Township
 Yuchi Korean Ethnic Township
 Qingling Manchu Ethnic Township
 Lianxing Ethnic Township
 Xingfu Manchu Ethnic Township
 Xinxing Manchu Ethnic Township
 Gongzheng Manchu Ethnic Township
 Lequn Manchu Ethnic Township
 Xile Manchu Ethnic Township
 Tongxin Manchu Ethnic Township
 Tuanjie Manchu Ethnic Township
 Niujia Manchu Ethnic Town
 Lalin Manchu Ethnic Town
 Hongqi Manchu Ethnic Township
 Yingchengzi Manchu Ethnic Township
 Minle Korean Ethnic Ethnic Township
 Yinglan Korean Ethnic Township
 Haode Mongol Ethnic Township
 Yishun Mongol Ethnic Township
 Chaodeng Mongol Ethnic Township
 Baiyinna Oroqen Ethnic Township
 Shibazhan Oroqen Ethnic Township
 Dongming Korean Ethnic Township
 Xinsheng Oroqen Ethnic Township
 Sijiazi Manchu Ethnic Township
 Kunhe Daur and Manchu Ethnic Township
 Yanjiang Manchu and Daur Ethnic Township
 Xinxing Oroqen Ethnic Township
 Xin'e Oroqen Ethnic Township
 Jilin Korean Ethnic Township
 Mingde Korean Ethnic Township
 Hainan Korean Ethnic Township
 Xin'an Korean Ethnic Town
 Sanchakou Korean Ethnic Town
 Shuishiying Manchu Ethnic Town
 Du'ermenqin Daur Ethnic Township
 Woniutu Daur Ethnic Town
 Manggetu Daur Ethnic Township
 Xingwang Evenk Ethnic Township
 Taha Manchu and Daur Ethnic Township
 Youyi Daur, Manchu, and Kirghiz Ethnic Township
 Jiangqiao Mongol Ethnic Town
 Ningjiang Mongol Ethnic Township
 Shengli Mongol Ethnic Township
 Xiangshu Korean Ethnic Township
 Sipai Nani Ethnic Township
 Chengfu Korean and Manchu Ethnic Township
 Xiangbai Manchu Ethnic Township
 Nianfeng Korean Ethnic Township

Henan 
 Jinzhai Hui Ethnic Township
 Chanhe Hui Ethnic Township
 Yuandian Hui Ethnic Township
 Guozhuang Hui Ethnic Township
 Yaozhuang Hui Ethnic Township
 Mazhuang Hui Ethnic Township
 Bodang Hui Ethnic Township
 Huji Hui Ethnic Township
 Shanhuo Hui Ethnic Township
 Aizhuang Hui Ethnic Township
 Caizhai Hui Ethnic Township

Hubei

Hunan 
 Daqiao Yao Ethnic Township

Inner Mongolia 
 Enhe Russian Ethnic Township

Jiangsu 
 Lingtang Hui Ethnic Township

Jiangxi

Shangrao Municipality
Taiyuan She-nation Ethnic Township in Yanshan County

Huangbi She-nation Ethnic Township in Yanshan County

Yingtan Municipality
Zhangping She-nation Ethnic Township in Guixi City

Fuzhou Municipality
Jinzhu She-nation Ethnic Township in LeAn County

Ganzhou Municipality
Chitu She-nation Ethnic Township in Nankang City

Ji'an Municipality
Donggu She-nation Ethnic Township in Qingyuan District

Longgang She-nation Ethnic Township in Yongfeng County

Jinping Minority-nation Ethnic Township in Xiajiang County

Jilin 
 Shuangyingzi Hui Ethnic Township
 Hujia Hui Ethnic Township
 Mangka Manchu Ethnic Township
 Yanhe Korean Ethnic Township
 Xin'aili Mongol Ethnic Township
 Hulitu Mongol Ethnic Township
 Huhecheli Mongol Ethnic Township
 Xianghai Mongol Ethnic Township
 Baolawendu Mongol Ethnic Township
 Hatuqi Mongol Ethnic Township
 Momoge Mongol Ethnic Township
 Wulajie Manchu Ethnic Town
 Wulin Korean Ethnic Township
 Sanhe Manchu and Korean Ethnic Township
 Yehe Manchu Ethnic Town
 Ershijiazi Manchu Ethnic Town
 Fangmagou Manchu Ethnic Township
 Namusi Mongol Ethnic Township
 Xiaoyang Manchu and Korean Ethnic Township
 Huayuan Korean Ethnic Township
 Liangshui Korean Ethnic Township
 Loujie Korean Ethnic Township
 Jiangjiadian Korean Ethnic Township
 Daquanyuan Manchu and Korean Ethnic Township
 Jindou Korean and Manchu Ethnic Township
 Yangbaozi Manchu Ethnic Township

Liaoning 
 Mantang Manchu Ethnic Township
 Sijiazi Mongol Ethnic Township
 Shajintai Mongol and Manchu Ethnic Township
 Liushutun Mongol and Manchu Ethnic Township
 Dongsheng Manchu and Mongol Ethnic Township
 Xiguantun Manchu and Mongol Ethnic Township
 Qidingshan Manchu Ethnic Township
 Santai Manchu Ethnic Township
 Yangjia Manchu Ethnic Township
 Guiyunhua Manchu Ethnic Township
 Taiping Manchu Ethnic Township
 Sishanling Manchu Ethnic Township
 Yahe Korean Ethnic Township
 Liangshuihe Mongol Ethnic Township
 Mayouying Manchu Ethnic Township
 Sanjiazi Mongol Ethnic Township )
 Sanjia Mongol Ethnic Township
 Dabao Mongol Ethnic Township
 Helong Manchu Ethnic Township
 Xialuhe Korean Ethnic Township
 Lagu Manchu Ethnic Township
 Tangtu Manchu Ethnic Township
 Weizigou Mongol Ethnic Township
 Erdaohezi Mongol Ethnic Township
 Xiliujiazi Mongol and Manchu Ethnic Township
 Daleng Mongol Ethnic Township
 Dazhai Manchu Ethnic Township
 Sandaogou Manchu Ethnic Township
 Yuantaizi Manchu Ethnic Township
 Baita Manchu Ethnic Township
 Jiumen Manchu Ethnic Township
 Yang'an Manchu Ethnic Township
 Liutaizi Manchu Ethnic Township )
 Hongyazi Manchu Ethnic Township
 Nandashan Manchu Ethnic Township
 Yaowang Manchu Ethnic Township
 Gaojialing Manchu Ethnic Township
 Haibin Manchu Ethnic Township
 Wanghai Manchu Ethnic Township
 Jianchang Manchu Ethnic Township
 Weizhan Manchu Ethnic Township
 Erdaowanzi Mongol Ethnic Township
 Xipingpo Manchu Ethnic Township
 Gejia Manchu Ethnic Township
 Gaodianzi Manchu Ethnic Township
 Fanjia Manchu Ethnic Township
 Wanghu Manchu Ethnic Township
 Mingshui Manchu Ethnic Township
 Wendilou Manchu Ethnic Township
 Toutai Manchu Ethnic Township
 Dadingbao Manchu Ethnic Township
 Waziyu Manchu Ethnic Township
 Toudaohe Manchu Ethnic Township
 Dicangsi Manchu Ethnic Township
 Chengguan Manchu Ethnic Township
 Liulonggou Manchu Ethnic Township
 Juliangtun Manchu Ethnic Township
 Tianshui Manchu Ethnic Township
 Jidongyu Manchu Ethnic Township
 Niejia Manchu Ethnic Township
 Shangbadi Manchu Ethnic Township
 Xiabadi Manchu Ethnic Township
 Huangqizhai Manchu Ethnic Township
 Linfeng Manchu Ethnic Township
 Hengdaohezi Manchu Ethnic Township
 Baiqizhai Manchu Ethnic Township
 Mingde Manchu Ethnic Township
 Dexing Manchu Ethnic Township
 Chengping Manchu Ethnic Township
 Helong Manchu Ethnic Township
 Yingchang Manchu Ethnic Township
 Jinxing Manchu Township

Ningxia

Qinghai

Shaanxi 

 Maoping Hui Ethnic Town
 

Shandong 
 Houji Hui Ethnic Town

Shanghai 
 none

Shanxi 
 none

Sichuan

Tianjin 
 Sungezhuang Manchu Ethnic Township

Tibet 
Within the Tibet Autonomous Region there are eight ethnic townships (མི་རིགས་ཤང་ mi-rigs shang 民族乡 mínzúxiāng), five belonging to the Monpa ethnicity (མོན་པ་/ mon pa /门巴/ Ménbā) and three belonging to the Lhopa ethnicity (ལྷོ་པ་/ lho-pa/ 珞巴/ Luòbā).

Five of these are under Shannan/Lhokha Prefecture:

Under མཚོ་སྣ་རྫོང་/ mtsho-sna rdzong/ 错那县/ Cuònà Xiàn

1) Le Monpa 	སླས་མོན་པ་	slas mon-pa	勒门巴族乡	Lēi Ménbāzú xiāng
2) Kongri Monpa ཀོང་རི་མོན་པ་	kong-ri mon-pa	贡日门巴族乡	Gòngrì Ménbāzú xiāng
3) Kyipa Monpa 	སྐྱིད་པ་མོན་པ་	skyid-pa mon-pa	吉巴门巴族乡	Jíbā Ménbāzú xiāng
4) Marmang Monpa མར་མང་མོན་པ་ mar-mang mon-pa 麻玛门巴族乡	Mámă Ménbāzú xiāng

Under ལྷུན་རྩེ་རྫོང་/ lhun-rtse rdzong/ 隆子县/ Lóngzǐ Xiàn
	
5) Doyul Lhopa	མདོ་ཡུལ་ལྷོ་པ་	mdo-yul lho-pa	斗玉珞巴族乡	Dòuyù Luòbāzú xiāng

Three of these are under Nyingchi Prefecture:

Under མེ་ཏོག་རྫོང་/ me-tog rdzong/ 墨脱县/ Mòtuō Xiàn
	
6) Takmo Lhopa 	སྟག་མོ་ལྷོ་པ་	stag-mo lho-pa	达木珞巴族乡	Dámù Luòbāzú xiāng

Under སྨན་གླིང་རྗོང་/ sman-gling rdzong/ 米林县/ Mǐlín Xiàn	

7) Neyul Lhopa 	གནས་ཡུལ་ལྷོ་པ་	gnas-yul lho-pa	南伊珞巴族乡	Nányī Luòbāzú xiāng

Under བྲག་ཡིབ་ཆུས་/ brag-yib chus/ 巴宜区/ Bāyí Qū	

8) Guntshang Monpa དགུན་ཚང་མོན་པ་	dgun-tshang mon-pa 更章门巴民族乡 Gèngzhāng Ménbā mínzú xiāng

Xinjiang

Yunnan

Zhejiang 

 Eshan She Ethnic Township
 Shuiting She Ethnic Township
 Liucheng She Ethnic Town
 Laozhu She Ethnic Town
 Lixin She Ethnic Township
 Zhuyang She Ethnic Township
 Banqiao She Ethnic Township
 Sanren She Ethnic Township
 Wuxi She Ethnic Township
 Anxi She Ethnic Township
 Shujian She Ethnic Township
 Fengyang She Ethnic Township
 Dailing She Ethnic Township
 Qingjie She Ethnic Township
 Siqian She Ethnic Town
 Zhuli She Ethnic Township
 Xikeng She Ethnic Town
 Zhoushan She Ethnic Township

Maps

Notes

References 

Township-level divisions of China